Marcus M. Merritt  was an American businessman and politician who served in both branches of the Chelsea, Massachusetts city council, and as a Member of the Massachusetts House of Representatives.

Notes

1839 births
Massachusetts city council members
Politicians from Chelsea, Massachusetts
Democratic Party members of the Massachusetts House of Representatives
1916 deaths